Koumpiodontosuchus is an extinct genus of neosuchian crocodyliform that lived in the Early Cretaceous. The only species is K. aprosdokiti, named in 2015.

Discovery

The first fossilised fragment of a skull was discovered by Diane Trevarthen on a beach near Sandown in the Isle of Wight in March 2011. Three months later, the second fragment of the skull was found by Austin and Finley Nathan. The two fragments were donated to Dinosaur Isle. Megan Jacobs also discovered an isolated tooth belonging to the same genus that were twice the size of those from the holotype. The species that the fragments belonged to was named Koumpiodontosuchus aprosdokiti, meaning "unexpected button-toothed crocodile".

When the fragments were first seen by Steve Sweetman, a palaeontologist with the University of Portsmouth, he thought that they belonged to the Bernissartia fagesii species because of its small size and button-shaped teeth. Sweetman published a paper on the discovery of the new species in Acta Palaeontologica Polonica and it was named and described in 2015.

See also
Wessex Formation
Barremian

References

External links
Paper on the discovery of the species

Extinct animals of Europe
Early Cretaceous crocodylomorphs of Europe
Prehistoric pseudosuchian genera